In 1992, the American National Standards Institute adopted ANSI/ASME Y14.1 Decimal Inch Drawing Sheet Size and Format, which defined a regular series of paper sizes based upon the de facto standard  in × 11 in "letter" size to which it assigned the designation "ANSI A". This series also includes "ledger"/"tabloid" as "ANSI B". This series is somewhat similar to the ISO 216 standard in that cutting a sheet in half would produce two sheets of the next smaller size. Unlike the ISO standard, however, the arbitrary aspect ratio forces this series to have two alternating aspect ratios. ANSI/ASME Y14.1 has been revised or updated in 1995, 2005, 2012 and 2022. It had an accompanying standard, ANSI/ASME Y14.1M, that defined metric drawing paper sizes based upon ISO 216 and ISO 5457. ASME Y14.1 and ASME Y14.1M have now been revised and consolidated into one document, ASME Y14.1-2020, Drawing Sheet Size and Format, published on 18 December 2020.

With care, documents can be prepared so that the text and images fit on either ANSI or their equivalent ISO sheets at 1:1 reproduction scale.

Size F does not continue the alphabetic series, because it does not exhibit the same aspect ratios.

Sizes G, H, J and K are roll formats. G size is  in (571.5 mm) high, but variable width up to 90 in (2286 mm) in increments of  in. Such sheets were at one time used for full-scale layouts of aircraft parts, wiring harnesses and the like, but today are generally not needed, due to widespread use of computer-aided design (CAD) and computer-aided manufacturing (CAM).

See also

References

American National Standards Institute standards
Stationery